Reichelsheim (Odenwald) is a municipality in the Odenwaldkreis (district) in Hesse, Germany.

Geography

Location
Reichelsheim lies in the middle Odenwald at elevations between 200 and 538 m in the middle of the Geo-Naturpark Bergstraße-Odenwald.

Neighbouring communities
Reichelsheim borders in the north on the communities of Fränkisch-Crumbach, Brensbach and Brombachtal, in the east on the town of Michelstadt and the community of Mossautal (all in the Odenwaldkreis), in the south on the community of Fürth and in the west on the town of Lindenfels (both in Bergstraße district).

Constituent communities
Reichelsheim’s Ortsteile, besides the main one, also called Reichelsheim, are Beerfurth, Bockenrod, Eberbach, Erzbach, Frohnhofen, Gersprenz, Gumpen, Klein-Gumpen, Laudenau, Ober-Kainsbach, Ober-Ostern, Rohrbach and Unter-Ostern.

History
In 1303, Reichelsheim had its first documentary mention.

Politics

The municipal election held on 26 March 2006 yielded the following results:

Mayors
In the mayoral election in 2008, Stefan Lopinsky (RWG) was elected with 61.2% of the vote.

From 1990 to 2008, the community’s mayor was Gerd Lode (SPD).

Coat of arms
The community’s arms might heraldically be described thus: Gules on a mount Or three oaks Or, in between also two oak saplings Or, above them three mullets of six argent, the sinister and dexter slightly lower.

Culture and sightseeing

Fairytale and Saga Days
Since 1995, yearly on the last weekend in October, the Reichelsheimer Märchen- und Sagentage are held, during which the Wildweibchenpreis (or “Wild Woman Prize”, this “wild woman” being a character in German legend) is awarded. Many mediaeval sets and costumes are on show to admire.

Regional museum
This is housed in the former town hall, Germany’s oldest timber-frame town hall with the stud bracing called a Mannform in German. Exhibition highlights are mining, typical handicrafts such as gingerbread baking, Gäulchesmacher (woodcarvers who carve horses), shakemakers and shoemakers along with village school life of yore and the old Reinheim-Reichelsheim railway.

Schloss Reichenberg
Today’s Schloss Reichenberg (palace) came into being as Richenburg Castle in the 13th century, and had its first documentary mention in 1307. Worth noting is the Herrenhaus (“Lord’s house”), or Palas. The Palas was called the Crooked Building (Krummer Bau) for its crooked footprint.

Here on 14 February 1776, Christian Gottfried Daniel Nees von Esenbeck, who later became a prominent botanist, zoologist and mycologist, was born. He was a friend of Goethe’s, a cofounder of the University of Bonn and the Bonn Botanical Garden, President of the Leopoldina for 40 years and Director of the Botanical Garden in Breslau (now Wrocław in Poland), where he died on 16 March 1858.

Until the mid 19th century, the castle was undergoing continual changes in noble ownership. From 1876 to 1924, the castle, now styled Schloss Reichenberg, was used as a private upperclass boys’ school. Thereafter, the Siefert family from the Frohnhof took over the palace. They sold some of the buildings in 1963 as a holiday home to Deutsche Bundespost.

In July 1979, Schloss Reichenberg was bought by the ecumenical community Offensive Junger Christen (OJC, literally “Young Christians’ Offensive”, but known in English as the Reichenberg Fellowship). They converted it into a publicly accessible international meeting and conference centre with a palace café. The upper, older part of the palace, the so-called Crooked Building, is currently being renovated.

Economy and infrastructure

Transport
By way of Bundesstraßen 47 (Nibelungenstraße between Michelstadt and Worms) and 38 (between Roßdorf bei Darmstadt and Weinheim/Mannheim), which together run through the community, Reichelsheim is linked to the long-distance road network. Bus connections to Bensheim, Fürth im Odenwald, Reinheim and Michelstadt afford a link to the public railway network (Deutsche Bahn and Odenwaldbahn).

Sons and daughters of the community

 Christian Gottfried Daniel Nees von Esenbeck (1776-1858), botanist and natural philosopher
 Carl Geist (1870-1931), German landscape painter
 Seligmann Meyer (1853-1925), Rabbi and community leader in Regensburg, Bavaria
 Claude Howard Haring (1903-1967) American Major League Baseball broadcaster in Philadelphia and Pittsburgh

References

External links

 Reichelsheim’s official website 
 Unter-Ostern 
 Beerfurth 

Odenwaldkreis